Roman Alexandrovich Golovchenko (born 10 August 1973) is a Belarusian politician who has served as Prime Minister of Belarus since 4 June 2020.

Early life and professional activity 
He was born on 10 August 1973 in Zhodzina as an only child. His father Alexander Nikolaevich Golovchenko graduated from the Belarusian Polytechnic Institute and worked as an engineer in the design bureau of Minsk Tractor Works. Roman Golovchenko lived in Zhodzina up until the age of 10, when he moved with his parents to Minsk, where he graduated from high school. He graduated from the Moscow State Institute of International Relations in 1996. He also graduated from the Academy of Public Administration in 2003.

Career

In 2013, he was made Ambassador to the United Arab Emirates, and was then also responsible for representing the country in Qatar, Kuwait, and Saudi Arabia. He was appointed to his current position by President Alexander Lukashenko two months prior to the 2020 Belarusian presidential election. Prior to his appointment, he served as the Chairman of the State Military-Industrial Committee. He offered his resignation amid a cabinet reshuffle on 17 August 2020, during the 2020 Belarusian protests. However, he was retained as Prime Minister of the new government.

Personal life 
He has a son from his first marriage and two daughters from his current marriage. His son Georgy Yatskovsky, is a student of the Bauman Moscow State Technical University. He is fluent in English, Arabic, German and Polish.

References

1973 births
Living people
People from Zhodzina
Diplomats from Minsk
Politicians from Minsk
Moscow State Institute of International Relations alumni
Prime Ministers of Belarus
Ambassadors of Belarus to the United Arab Emirates
21st-century Belarusian politicians